Afruca is a genus of crabs belonging to the family Ocypodidae.

The species of this genus are found in Africa.

Species:
 Afruca tangeri (Eydoux, 1835)

References

Ocypodoidea
Decapod genera